Zhai Jun (born December 1954) is a Chinese diplomat, who has served as China's Special Envoy on the Middle Eastern Issue since 2019. As of 2022, he was the incumbent in the position. Previously, he served as Deputy Foreign Minister from 2009 to 2014, and was appointed Chinese ambassador to France in January 2014, replacing Kong Quan.

References

1954 births
Living people
Ambassadors of China to France
Diplomats of the People's Republic of China
Ambassadors of China to Monaco